Tillandsia globosa is a species in the genus Tillandsia. This species is native to Brazil and Venezuela.

References

globosa
Flora of Brazil
Flora of Venezuela